Mark Mokin (born 26 January 2006) is a Belarusian footballer who currently plays as a forward for Dnepr Mogilev.

Club career
Mokin became the third youngest goal-scorer in the history of the Belarusian Premier League when he netted for Dnepr Mogilev against Dinamo Minsk in July 2022.

International career
Mokin has represented Belarus at under-17 level.

Career statistics

Club

Notes

References

2006 births
Living people
Belarusian footballers
Belarus youth international footballers
Association football forwards
Belarusian Premier League players
FC Dnepr Mogilev players